Mickie Caspi is an Israeli-American calligrapher and artist specializing in Judaica.

Early life and education
Caspi was raised in Highland Park, Illinois by two artists, Thelma and Philip Padawer, who encouraged creativity from a young age. She lived in Israel on Kibbutz Nachshon for three years (1970–73). After returning to Highland Park, she studied art at Columbia College in Chicago.

Career and artistic inspiration
Caspi worked as an artist-in-residence at the Kohl Jewish Teacher Center in Wilmette, Illinois. After graduating from Columbia College in 1982, she returned to Israel, living on Kibbutz Harel and then in Jerusalem. She spent seven years as a freelance artist and calligrapher in Israel before returning to the United States in 1989 and establishing Caspi Cards & Art. Her hundreds of original designs have been reproduced on greeting cards, Judaic art prints, calendars and is known for her innovations as a Ketubah artist. She introduced the first pre-printed Same Sex Ketubah text in 1994, predating Same-sex marriage laws in the United States.

Caspi derives her inspiration from many sources, including traditional Jewish motifs, Persian and Arabic illumination, contemporary graphics, as well as art nouveau and art deco. Her art has been exhibited in Jerusalem, Tel Aviv, Chicago, San Francisco and Boston, and her illustrations have appeared in Hebrew children's books and English publications. According to Marc Michael Epstein (scholar of religion, focusing on Jewish religious culture), "Examples by American artist... Mickie Caspi are among the best and brightest examples of motifs often found in ketubot from the late twentieth and early twenty-first centuries."

Caspi volunteered at the Horace Mann School in Newton, Massachusetts. In 2011, the Oakland Hebrew Day School used her artwork as a stepping off point for the students to create their own works of art. She has illustrated books including the 1987 reprint of The Sea's Gift, 1930 [Matnat Ha-Yam] by Levin Kipnis, which represented Israel at the International Children's Book Invitational.

An avid organic gardener, Caspi incorporates the beauty of nature into much of her artwork. She currently resides in Newton, Massachusetts, is married, and has three children and two grandsons.

Exhibitions and awards

 Jacobson, David, (Curator); Equal Vows: Same-Sex Ketubot in Washington State (2012). Conservative Lithograph Ketubah by Mickie Caspi. Seattle, Washington: Linda Hodges Gallery
 Louie Award Finalist. BR405 Bar Mitzvah Card by Mickie Caspi. Jewish Everyday Category Competition (1998)
 Illuminations, an exhibition about History, Continuity and Innovation in the Hebrew Scribal Arts, Jewish Community Museum. San Francisco, CA (1990)
 Art Show Exhibition, Centerpoint. Brookline, MA (December 1989 - February 1990)
 Fisher, Eliezer (Private Collection/Fisher Gallery); Megilot-Ketubot (1986). Ketubah Illustration and Calligraphy by Mickie Klugman. Jerusalem, Israel.

Publications

 Epstein, Marc Michael (Editor) Skies of Parchment, Seas of Ink: Jewish Illuminated Manuscripts (2015); p241-243 Rakefet Ketubah by Mickie Caspi. Princeton University Press (2015). .
 Moore, Deborah Dash & Gertz, Nurith (Editors); The Posen Library of Jewish Culture and Civilization, Volume 10: 1973-2005 (2012). p1103 Season's Ketubah by Mickie Caspi. New Haven:  Yale University Press. .
 Sorrentino, Paolo (Director); This Must Be the Place (2011). Healing Arts Prayer by Mickie Caspi.  Images used by Cheyenne Pictures, Inc.
 Abbot, Paul (Creator); Shameles (2011). Jerusalem Rainbow Ketubah and Jewish Art Calendar by Mickie Caspi.  Images used by Bonanza Productions.
 Marshall, Scott (Director); Keeping Up with the Steins (2006). Bar Mitzvah Prayer and Man of Honor Blessings by Mickie Caspi.  Images used by A Road Picture.
 Diamant, Anita; The New Jewish Baby Book (2005). p200 Noah's Ark by Mickie Caspi. Vermont: Jewish Lights Publishing. .
 Diamant, Anita; The New Jewish Wedding (2001). p93-94 Alternative Egalitarian Ketubah Text by Mickie Caspi. New York: Simon & Schuster. .
 Hoffman, Edward; The Kabbalah Deck (2000). Calligraphy & Illustration by Mickie Caspi. San Francisco: Chronicle Books. .
 Lerner, Rabbi Devon A.; Celebrating Interfaith Marriages (1999). p245-246 Interfaith Ketubah Text by Mickie Caspi. New York: Henry Holt. .
 Latner, Helen; The Everything Jewish Wedding Book (1998). p77-78 Interfaith and Egalitarian Ketubah Texts by Mickie Caspi. Massachusetts: Adams Media. .
 Stern, David H.; Jewish New Testament (1989). Cover Illustration by Mickie Klugman. Clarksville. .
 Kipnis, Levin. (Author); Matnat ha-yam (1987). Illustrated by Mickie Klugman. Tel Aviv: Sifriyat poʻalim. OCLC Number:	19192504. 
 Stuhlman, Daniel D. (Author); My Own Pesah Story (1981). Illustrated by Micha Klugman. Chicago: BYLS Press. .

References

External links 
 Official Website

1961 births
20th-century calligraphers
20th-century Israeli women artists
21st-century calligraphers
21st-century Israeli women artists
American calligraphers 
Israeli calligraphers 
Living people
Women calligraphers